Heglund is a surname. Notable people with the surname include:

 Knud Heglund (1894–1960), Danish stage and film actor
 Lili Heglund (1904–1992), Danish film actress
 Nina Heglund (born 1993), Norwegian-British handball player
 Svein Heglund (1918–1998), Norwegian engineer and military officer